The George William Anderson executive council was  executive council of British Ceylon. The government was led by Governor George William Anderson.

Executive council members

See also
 Cabinet of Sri Lanka

Notes

References

1850 establishments in Ceylon
1855 disestablishments in Ceylon
Cabinets established in 1850
Cabinets disestablished in 1855
Ceylonese executive councils
Ministries of Queen Victoria